A solstice is a bi-annual astronomical event, when the Sun's apparent position in the sky reaches its northernmost or southernmost extremes.

Solstice may also refer to:

Film
 Solstice (film), a 2008 thriller film
 Solstice, a 1968 film produced and edited by Edward Summer

Video games 
 Solstice (1990 video game), a puzzle game released for the Nintendo Entertainment System
 Solstice (2016 video game), a fantasy/mystery visual novel
Solstice, an expansion to the puzzle game OneShot

Music
 Solstice (doom metal band), a British epic doom metal band
 Solstice (British rock band), a British rock band
 Solstice (American band), an American death metal band
 Solstice (album), 1975 album by Ralph Towner
 "Solstice", a 2011 song by Björk from Biophilia
 "Solstice", a 2016 song by If These Trees Could Talk, opening song from the album The Bones of a Dying World

Other uses
 Solstice (character), a DC Comics superheroine and member of the Teen Titans
 Pontiac Solstice, a General Motors vehicle
 Operation Solstice, a German armoured offensive operation on the Eastern Front of World War II
 Samsung Solstice, a smartphone built by Samsung Electronics and partners
 Solstice DiskSuite or Solaris Volume Manager RAID software
 Solstice (novel), a novel by Joyce Carol Oates
 Pontiac Solstice, a car.

See also
 Celebrity Solstice, a cruise ship
 Soulstice, American electronica/dance band
 SoulStice, American hip hop artist